Haplochromis nyanzae is a species of cichlid endemic to Lake Victoria.  This species can reach a length of  SL.

References

nyanzae
Fish described in 1962
Fish of Lake Victoria
Taxa named by Humphry Greenwood
Taxonomy articles created by Polbot